Sankhkare Mentuhotep III (also Montuhotep III) of the Eleventh Dynasty was Pharaoh of Egypt during the Middle Kingdom. He was assigned a reign of 12 years in the Turin Canon.

Reign 
Mentuhotep III succeeded his father Mentuhotep II to the throne. It is believed that, following his father's long 51 years of reign, Mentuhotep III was relatively old when he acceded to the throne and reigned for 12 years. Despite its short duration, Mentuhotep's reign is known for his expedition to Punt and architectural innovations.

Name 
Mentuhotep III's titulary is very similar to the third and final one of his father. Mentuhotep III is known to have had at least two praenomen: the well known Sankhkare and also

Expedition to Punt 

Mentuhotep III sent an expedition to the Land of Punt during the 8th year of his reign, something that had not been done since the Old Kingdom. An inscription in the Wadi Hammamat describes the expedition as being 3000 men strong and under the command of the steward Henenu. As they left Coptos in direction of the Red Sea (port of Mersa Gawasis?), they dug 12 wells for future expeditions and cleared the region of rebels. They returned from Punt with incense, gum and perfumes, and quarried the Wadi Hammamat for stones.

Monuments 

Sankhkare Mentuhotep was responsible for several building projects in the 12 years of his reign. He extended the temple of Monthu in Medamud, a monumental decorated doorway bearing his likeness and royal titles now resides in the Louvre.

Sankhkare Mentuhotep also had a mudbrick temple erected at Thoth Hill in Western Thebes. The temple was built on the site of an older archaic temple. It was dedicated to the god Montu-Ra. This temple may have been destroyed by an earthquake towards the end of the 11th Dynasty.

It was long presumed that his own tomb and mortuary temple was begun in Deir el-Bahari, but never completed. This temple was located in a separate valley a short distance from his father's mortuary temple. A causeway would have led up to a temple platform. A burial chamber lined with limestone slabs was completed and sealed, but apparently it never contained a burial. The association of the monument with Sankhkare Mentuhotep was circumstantial, based on co-location with the tomb (TT280) of the High Steward Meketre, one of the chief officials of the reign. However Dorothea Arnold recently provided compelling evidence that the monument is the likely unfinished Theban tomb of Amenemhat I, the funerary monument of Sankhkare Mentuhotep remains unknown. However, the attribution of the monument to Amenemhat I is unproven as well. The owner of the unnamed royal burial place must remain open.

Family 

Mentuhotep III was the son and successor of Mentuhotep II. One of the wives of Mentuhotep II, Tem, was given the title Mother of the Dual King and based on that title she is almost certainly the mother of Mentuhotep III. Mentuhotep III's family is mostly a mystery. It is currently believed that he fathered his successor Mentuhotep IV with one of his harem wives, Imi. This is however still debated Mentuhotep IV's mother is known to have been Queen Imi. If he was the son of Mentuhotep III,  Imi must have been the wife of Mentuhotep III.

References

Further reading 

21st-century BC Pharaohs
20th-century BC Pharaohs
Pharaohs of the Eleventh Dynasty of Egypt
20th-century BC deaths
Land of Punt